Die Stem van Suid-Afrika, also known as "The Call of South Africa" or simply "Die Stem", is a former national anthem of South Africa. There are two versions of the song, one in English and the other in Afrikaans, which were in use early on in the Union of South Africa alongside God Save the Queen and as the sole anthem after South Africa became a republic. It was the sole national anthem from 1957 to 1994, and shared co-national anthem status with "God Save the King/Queen" from 1938 to 1957. After the end of apartheid in the early 1990s, it was retained as a co-national anthem along with "Nkosi Sikelel' iAfrika" from 1994 to 1997, when a new hybrid song incorporating elements of both songs was adopted as the country's new national anthem, which is still in use.

History

Background and inception
The music composed that ended up being accepted was actually a second version; the first did not satisfy Langenhoven. It was widely used by the South African Broadcasting Corporation in the 1920s, which played it at the close of daily broadcasts, along with "God Save The King". It was recorded for the first time in 1926 when its first and third verses were performed by Betty Steyn in England for the Zonophone record label; it was sung publicly for the first time on 31 May 1928 at a raising of the new South African national flag. In 1938, South Africa proclaimed it to be one of the two co-national anthems of the country, along with "God Save the King".

It was sung in English as well as Afrikaans from 1952 onward, with both versions having official status in the eyes of the state, while "God Save the Queen" did not cease to be a co-national anthem until May 1957, when it was dropped from that role. However, it remained the country's royal anthem until 1961, as it was a Commonwealth realm until that point. The poem originally had only three verses, but the government asked the author to add a fourth verse with a religious theme. The English version is for the most part a faithful translation of the Afrikaans version with a few minor changes.

Composition
It is uplifting in tone, addressing throughout of commitment to the Vaderland and to God. However, it was generally disliked by black South Africans, who saw it as triumphalist and strongly associated it with the apartheid regime where one verse shows dedication to Afrikaners (though the specific mention of Afrikaners is omitted in the English version to avoid alienating the English speaking whites living in South Africa as they are not considered Afrikaners) and another to the Great Trek of the Voortrekkers. P. W. Botha, who was the state president of South Africa during the 1980s, was fond of the song and made his entourage sing it when they visited Switzerland during his presidency.

Decline
As the dismantling of apartheid began in the early 1990s, South African teams were readmitted to international sporting events, which presented a problem as to the choice of national identity South Africa had to present. Agreements were made with the African National Congress (ANC) that "Die Stem van Suid-Afrika" would not be sung at rugby matches, due to its connection to the apartheid system and minority rule (which led the ANC and other such groups at the time to view the song as offensive). However, at a rugby union test match against New Zealand in 1992, the crowd spontaneously sang "Die Stem" during a moment of silence for victims of political violence in South Africa, and although it was ostensibly agreed upon beforehand that it would not be played, an instrumental recording of "Die Stem" was played over the stadium's PA system's loudspeakers after the New Zealand national anthem was performed, and spectators sang along, sparking controversy afterwards.

Although it remained the official national anthem of the state during this time period, both the usage of it and the then-national flag began to dwindle whenever possible, particularly overseas. For example, at the 1992 Summer Olympics in Barcelona that year, Schiller's "Ode to Joy", as set to Beethoven's music, was used instead of it, along with a neutral Olympic-style flag instead of the South African flag at the time.

"Die Stem van Suid-Afrika"'s future seemed in doubt as the country prepared to transition to majority rule, with many predicting that it would not remain after the transition into the new democratic dispensation. In 1993, a commission sought out a new national anthem for South Africa, with 119 entries being suggested, but none were chosen. Instead, it was decided to retain "Die Stem"'s official status after the advent of full multi-racial democracy which followed the 1994 general election. When the old South African flag was lowered for the last time at the parliament building in Cape Town, "Die Stem" was performed in Afrikaans and then in English as the new South African flag was raised. After 1994, it shared equal status with "Nkosi Sikelel' iAfrika", which had long been a traditional hymn used by the ANC. In 1995, "Die Stem van Suid-Afrika" was sung by a black choir at the Rugby World Cup final match, as it had been done at the 1994 South African presidential inauguration in Pretoria, first in Afrikaans and then in English.

Consolidation
The practice of singing two different national anthems had been a cumbersome arrangement during the transition to post-apartheid South Africa. On most occasions, it was usually the first verse of "Die Stem van Suid-Afrika" that was sung at ceremonies, in both official languages prior to 1994, with some English medium schools in what was then Natal Province singing the first verse in Afrikaans and the second in English. During this period of two national anthems, the custom was to play both "Die Stem" and "Nkosi Sikelel' iAfrika" during occasions that required the playing of a national anthem. However, this proved cumbersome as performing the dual national anthems took as much as five minutes to conclude. In 1997, with the adoption of a new national constitution, a new composite national anthem was introduced, which combined part of "Nkosi Sikelel 'iAfrika" and part of "Die Stem van Suid-Afrika" into a single composition in order to form a new hybrid song.

Legacy
Since the end of apartheid and the adoption of a new national anthem in the 1990s, the status of "Die Stem" has become somewhat controversial in contemporary South Africa, due to its connection with the apartheid regime and white minority rule.

Although elements of it are used in the current South African national anthem, in recent years some South Africans have called for those segments to be removed due to their connection with apartheid, whereas others defend the inclusion of it, as it was done for post-apartheid re-conciliatory reasons. When "Die Stem" was mistakenly played by event organisers in place of the current South African national anthem during a UK-hosted women's field hockey match in 2012, it sparked outrage and confusion among the South African staff members and players present.

The Afrikaans version remains popular with Afrikaner nationalists and far-right organisations such as the Afrikaner Weerstandsbeweging, where it is sometimes performed at the funerals of such groups' members or at demonstrations by them. Die Stem was also the name of a far-right periodical during the apartheid era.

Lyrics

In popular culture
"Die Stem van Suid-Afrika" is featured in the films Catch a Fire and Invictus.
"Die Stem van Suid-Afrika" is featured in the video game Nigel Mansell's World Championship Racing.
South African singer Lance James recorded a country-western rendition of "Die Stem van Suid-Afrika" for his album Die Stem Op Spesiale Versoek.
South African singer Manuel Escórcio used the lyrics in his song Ons vir jou, Suid-Afrika.
South African rapper Jack Parow used some lines of the first three verses in his song Veilig.

See also 

 List of historical national anthems
 National anthem of South Africa
 National anthem of the Orange Free State
 National anthem of the Transvaal
 Flag of South Africa (1928–1994)

Notes

References

External links 

Instrumental MIDI rendition

1921 songs
Afrikaans
African anthems
Apartheid in South Africa
Historical national anthems
National symbols of South Africa
South African songs
National anthem compositions in D major
Articles containing video clips
Songs based on poems